Hasselbach is a German surname. Notable people with the surname include:

 Carl Gustav Friedrich Hasselbach (1809–1882), German politician
 Harald Hasselbach (born 1967), American football player
 Ingo Hasselbach (born 1967), German political activist and author

See also
 Karl Albert Hasselbalch (1874-1962), Danish physician and chemist
 Hasselbach (disambiguation)

German-language surnames